The 2019 European Wildwater Championships was the 11th edition of the global wildwater canoeing competition, European Wildwater Championships, organised by the European Canoe Association.

Results

K1 sprint men

K1 classic men

K1 sprint women

K1 classic women

C1 sprint men

C1 classic men

C1 sprint women

C1 classic women

C2 sprint men

C2 classic men

See also
 Wildwater canoeing
 European Canoe Association

References

External links
 

2019 in North Macedonia
European Wildwater Championships